Robert Forman Six (June 25, 1907 – October 6, 1986) was the CEO of Continental Airlines from 1936 to 1980.  His career began in the earliest days of U.S. commercial aviation; his determined, scrappy, risk-taking nature paid off for Continental Airlines, the company that would for 45 years be forged in his image.  Owing in large part to the foundation he laid, Continental became one of the largest and most profitable legacy airlines in the world.

Six was one of the last of the group of innovators, pioneers, and visionaries (including Juan Trippe, William A. Patterson, Jack Frye, C.R. Smith, and Eddie Rickenbacker) who built the U.S. airline industry into what it is today. Six saw his own airline grow from a tiny, three-stop operation into a major global network airline with services spanning the U.S. and Canada, extending to Europe, the Asia-Pacific region, and Latin America.

Early years

Born in Stockton, California, Six graduated from Weber Grammar School. At age 17 he dropped out of high school.

Robert Six started his business career in sales for a public utility company, but was fired for taking flying lessons on company time. Six learned to fly in an Alexander Eaglerock biplane with an OX-5 engine. After about 10 hours aloft, he received pilot's license (number 5772) in 1929, at the age of 22. In that same year, he bought an OX-5-powered Travel Air biplane from Walter Beech, founded the Valley Flying Service, and proceeded to sell scenic rides to passengers, and to race on weekends.

Though many credit Six with being the founder of Continental Airlines, the airline's history dates to 1934 when it was operated under the name of Varney Speed Lines by its owners Walter Varney and Louis Mueller. The future international airline had humble beginnings, with Varney operating single-engine Lockheed Vega aircraft between El Paso, Texas, and Pueblo, Colorado, with stops in Albuquerque, Santa Fe, NM, and Las Vegas, NM.  Mueller gained control of the carrier in 1936 and sold 40% of the company to Six. In July 1937, Robert Six changed the name of Varney Speed Lines to Continental Airlines and the carrier moved its headquarters to Denver, Colorado, which would become the airline's central hub for the next 55 years.

World War II and the postwar years
During the 1940s and 1950s, Continental Airlines, led by Six, was able to expand its fleet of aircraft with profits from World War II when it provided air transportation to the military. Continental also performed military aircraft modification work at its Denver maintenance facilities. Six spent some time during the war in the United States Army Air Corps and was involved in planning improved routes to ferry American aircraft to the European theater.  Six's work there represented significant improvements over original routes which had seen aircraft losses due to weather.  He returned to Continental before the war ended and resumed his leadership role.

In 1951 Six met Broadway legend Ethel Merman in a New York city nightclub.  Merman, a two-time divorcee, felt enchanted by Six's strong demeanor and common sense.  Following a courtship, they married in 1953, and she took a hiatus from her Broadway career and moved to Colorado with him, settling into a 27-room mansion in Cherry Hills Village, Colorado near Denver. There, life with Six became oppressive, and, according to Merman's son, he, his sister and mother and even his elderly grandparents suffered dramatic episodes of emotional and physical violence from a regularly explosive Six, who, behind his back, was called Jumbo and Big Meanie by his stepchildren. Merman found Denver society rural and limited after that of New York. Six and Merman divorced in 1960. In Six's view, Merman had failed him in not becoming a public relations prop for Continental.

In 1953 Continental merged with Pioneer Airlines, gaining access to 16 more cities in Texas and New Mexico.  This merger allowed Continental Airlines to operate routes between Texas and Colorado/New Mexico, connecting with the line's Denver-Albuquerque-El Paso services.

Dramatic expansion and move to Los Angeles

By the end of the 1950s, Continental Airlines had seen a broad expansion of its routes.  In 1957, it flew for the first time from Chicago to Los Angeles (both nonstop and via Denver), and from Denver and Los Angeles to Kansas City.  Continental was one of the first operators of the Boeing 707, taking delivery of its first 707s in spring of 1959.  Six, not being satisfied with jet service alone, introduced dramatic service innovations with Continental's 707 operations, which were described as "...nothing short of luxurious" by the Los Angeles Times, and, "...clearly, the finest in the airline industry" by the Chicago Tribune.

In 1961 in Honolulu, Six married Hollywood star Audrey Meadows of The Honeymooners television fame (Meadows played the role of Alice Kramden).  The feisty Meadows was a good match for Six's sometimes stubborn nature.  She served effectively as an advisory director on Continental's board, offering many of the suggestions that made Continental's inflight and ground services preeminent. The Sixes were socially prominent in Beverly Hills, where they lived.  Meadows' television and acting career afforded the Sixes opportunities for their close relationships with prominent Hollywood stars such as John Wayne, Henry Fonda, James Stewart, and Bob Hope.  The couple spent many long weekends at their Lazy 6 Ranch near Montrose, Colorado, where Hollywood stars were frequent guests.

In 1963, Continental moved its headquarters from Denver to Los Angeles.  This change coincided with rapid growth of the carrier's route network.  Continental added all-jet service from Los Angeles to Houston (both nonstop and with services via Phoenix, Tucson, El Paso, Midland/Odessa, Austin, and San Antonio), and from Denver and to Seattle, Portland, New Orleans, and Houston (both nonstop and with services via Wichita and Tulsa/Oklahoma City).  In a separate route award, Continental was selected to serve the route from the Pacific Northwest to San Jose and Ontario, California.  The introduction of service from Los Angeles to Honolulu/Hilo was in 1969; Continental's first Boeing 747s arrived in May 1970. McDonnell Douglas DC-10s were added to the fleet in 1971, giving Continental the ability to carry its burgeoning traffic on key routes between Los Angeles, Denver, Chicago, Honolulu, Houston, and Seattle.

During the Vietnam War, Continental provided cargo and troop transportation for the United States Army and Marine Corps to Asian and Pacific bases. Continental's 707s were the most common nonmilitary aircraft transiting Saigon Tan Son Nhat airport. As a result of Continental's experience in Pacific operations, the carrier formed subsidiary Air Micronesia, picking up island-hopping routes between Yap/Majuro/Saipan/Guam and Honolulu, which were served with Boeing 727 aircraft.  One of Six's long-cherished goals was for Continental to become a major player in the Pacific basin, something the airline would achieve only after his retirement.

At Six's insistence, Continental (with Pan Am and Trans World Airlines) was a launch airline for the Boeing 747 aircraft.  Its upper-deck first-class lounge won awards worldwide for the most refined cabin interior among all airlines, as did meal services developed by Continental's Cordon Bleu-trained executive chefs. Continental's 747 services from Chicago and Denver to Los Angeles and Honolulu set the standard for service in the western U.S.  When asked by one Denver customer service agent in 1974 why he flew Continental wherever he could, Hollywood legend Henry Fonda remarked, "This operation is class; strictly class!" During the 1970s, Continental's 747 service was short-lived, the airline having concluded that the DC-10 was better suited to the route structure and passenger loads.

Triumph and loss

After the Airline Deregulation Act of 1978, like many U.S. carriers, Continental expanded rapidly.  Within two years, new nonstop services from its Denver and Houston–Intercontinental hubs included: New York–LaGuardia, New York–JFK, Newark, Boston, Philadelphia, Baltimore, Washington–National, Washington–Dulles, Cleveland, Detroit, Pittsburgh, Atlanta, Miami, Fort Lauderdale, Tampa, Dallas Fort Worth, Minneapolis/Saint Paul, Milwaukee, St Louis, Las Vegas, Reno, San Jose (CA), and San Francisco, as well as many smaller cities in the Midwest and western U.S., and new international routes to London–Gatwick, Tokyo–Narita, Manila, Sydney, and Melbourne, and more destinations in Mexico than served by any other carrier. This rapid growth required the expansion of Continental's existing fleet of 747, DC-10, 727-200, and DC-9 aircraft with large numbers of MD-80, 737-model and Airbus aircraft, and the formation of alliances with larger commuter airlines in Houston and Denver to serve smaller communities in the Rockies, Plains, and Southwest.

In 1981, Texas Air Corporation, controlled by airline industry entrepreneur Frank Lorenzo, acquired a controlling interest in Continental Airlines following a contentious battle for control with Continental's management, including Six and then-CEO Al Feldman, who were adamant in their resistance to Lorenzo. Continental's labor unions joined the antitakeover battle because of their fears over "Lorenzo's deregulation tactics" and his prior dealings with airline labor unions. However, Texas Air prevailed, and in June 1982, Texas International Airlines, controlled by Texas Air, was merged into Continental Airlines. Texas International ceased to exist, but the new Continental moved its headquarters to Houston, home of Texas Air.

In spite of labor friction and turmoil resulting from the acquisition, by the time of Six's death in 1986, the airline he molded and forged had become one of the largest airlines in the U.S. Continental's innovative and popular services centered on the busy Denver, Houston, and New York/Newark hubs.

Six died in his sleep at his home in Beverly Hills, California, on October 6, 1986.

Legacy and honors

In 1971, Six was nominated and inducted into the Colorado Aviation Hall of Fame.

In June 1974, Six was awarded an honorary doctorate by the University of Colorado at Boulder. He was the 1977 recipient of the Tony Jannus Award for his distinguished contributions to commercial aviation.

In 1980, he was inducted into the U.S. National Aviation Hall of Fame at the National Museum of the United States Air Force, Wright-Patterson Air Force Base in Dayton, Ohio.

Six was a key player in the revealed mystery in the third episode of Starlee Kine's Gimlet Media-produced podcast "Mystery Show".

In 2011, United Airlines, which merged with Continental Airlines, named a plane (N77006) after Robert Six.

References

Sources
 
 
 

1907 births
1986 deaths
American airline chief executives
United States Army personnel of World War II
Aviators from California
Burials at Holy Cross Cemetery, Culver City
Businesspeople from California
History of aviation
National Aviation Hall of Fame inductees
People from Stockton, California
United Airlines people
United States Army Air Forces soldiers
20th-century American businesspeople